Tyler Abell (born 9 August 1932) is an American lawyer who briefly served as Chief of Protocol of the United States in the late 1960s.

Personal life
Abell is the child of Luvie Moore Abell and writer George Abell. When Abell was 5 years old, his mother and her new husband, columnist Drew Pearson, took custody of him while on the British island of Sark, claiming that George had taken the child overseas without his mother's permission. Abell later edited Drew Pearson Diaries, 1949-1959 (1974).

Abell was married to Bess Abell, until her death in 2020. She served as White House Social Secretary under President Lyndon B. Johnson. They were close personal friends with Johnson and his wife, Lady Bird Johnson, who hosted Abell's wedding reception.

Career
On September 25, 1968, President Lyndon B. Johnson named Abell to become Chief of Protocol at the U.S. State Department, and he took office less than a week later. Abell resigned on January 20, 1969, after Richard Nixon won the presidential election and the Democratic Party lost control of the White House. Nixon named Emil Mosbacher, Jr. to succeed Abell as Chief of Protocol.

Abell later became a lawyer and the French-American Executive Committee co-chair of the Association du Mouvement des Français de l'Étranger.

References

Living people
1932 births
Chiefs of Protocol of the United States